Patriarch Maximus IV or Patriarch Maximos IV may refer to:

 Maximus IV of Constantinople, Ecumenical Patriarch in 1491–1497
 Maximos IV Sayegh, patriarch of the Melkite Greek Catholic Church in 1948–1967

See also
 Patriarch (disambiguation)
 Maximus (disambiguation)